Canóvanas may refer to:

Canóvanas, Puerto Rico, a municipality
Canóvanas, Canóvanas, Puerto Rico, a barrio
Canóvanas, Loíza, Puerto Rico, a barrio
Canóvanas barrio-pueblo, a barrio